The Federal Woodlands Preservation League is a volunteer environmental advocacy organization created with the goal of decreasing logging around Meech Lake and Kingsmere areas. Since its founding in 1934, the League has worked with the Canadian Federal Government on preservation issues, and is credited with creating Gatineau Park.

History
On September 20, 1933, King met with his private secretary Harry Baldwin to discuss the issue. "We talked of starting a 'Society to preserve the Natural Beauty of the environs of Ottawa' – that was the suggested title I gave it, growing out of his wish to bring pressure on Quebec & Fed. govts. to save the roadsides their fringe of trees etc." wrote King in his diary.

At the League's first meeting on May 8, 1935, at Ottawa's Chateau Laurier, prime minister R.B. Bennett and opposition leader Mackenzie King were appointed as its patrons. Its first president was Harry Baldwin.

The list of its patrons and members includes many notable citizens of the day. While it operated between 1934 and 1947, members of the league included Governors General Bessborough, Tweedsmuir and Athlone; Prime Ministers Sir Robert Borden, Arthur Meighen, R.B. Bennett, and Mackenzie King; Harry Baldwin, Percy Sparks, Duncan MacTavish, Ernest Lapointe and Ambrose O’Brien. As well, its membership included Colonel J.T.C. Thompson, W.D. Herridge, Lieutenant-Colonel Cameron Macpherson Edwards and Charles Bowman.

The Lower Gatineau Woodlands Survey
On April 3, 1935, the chairman of the League's research committee, Percy Sparks, urged Interior Minister T.G. Murphy to commission a study of the Gatineau Hills' woodlands.

The resulting report, the Lower Gatineau Woodlands Survey, described the "effects of wood cutting operations and of fires on the aesthetic value of the forests" in the lower Gatineau valley and recommended remedial measures. The Survey drew up a history of forest fires and logging activities throughout the 19th and early 20th centuries, examined the excessive logging caused by the depression, and dealt with other questions such as land ownership, timber growth rates, yield per acre, etc. It concluded that nearly 40 percent of the area surveyed had been "completely or partially cut" in the previous 20 years.

The Survey outlined eight options to control excessive cutting in the area, including public education, land purchase and the creation of a national park. Of the alternatives discussed, the report recommended gradual land purchase. This would allow the government to acquire the most important areas and purchase additional land as funds and time allowed. The national park method was downplayed because the size of the area studied – about  – was too small and it was felt the scheme would be too expensive and complicated in the short term.

Although the Survey was published in late 1935, the government did not start purchasing land until 1938. Two factors explain this delay: first, a new government was elected in late 1935, with Mackenzie King's Liberals defeating the Bennett Conservatives; second, King seemed very hesitant and cautious in this regard, since he had been wrongly accused in 1927 of wanting to build a national parkway to ease access to his summer residence at Kingsmere. Moreover, King's journal entry of December 20, 1937, indicates that he continued to fear criticism in this regard and needed prodding to take action. The entry relates a conversation King had with Finance Minister Charles Dunning concerning the creation of a national park in the Gatineau Hills:

On October 9, 1937, Sparks was elected president of the Federal Woodlands Preservation League to replace Harry Baldwin. And, on December 13, 1937, Sparks sent a memorandum to King's office concerning the League's recent activities. The memorandum proposed an action plan for creating Gatineau Park, including the number of acres to be acquired and their cost, as well as public information and funding plans. It also informed Prime Minister King that Sparks would be giving a speech on this issue at the Chateau Laurier on January 18, 1938.

Land purchases begin
As a result of League efforts, land purchases for Gatineau Park began in 1938. By 1941,  had been acquired. However, the war put a stop to land acquisitions and to League activities. Following the war, in 1945, the League  resumed its activities by pressing the government to continue expanding and developing the park. Though it had been created in 1938, the park remained without shape or direction. To solve the problem, Sparks wrote what is in essence the first Gatineau Park master plan: the Memorandum on the Enlargement and Development of the Gatineau Park, submitted to the Federal District Commission on October 9, 1945. The document recommended that the park's size be increased to at least , provided a funding scheme for the purchase of land, and recommended the building of a parkway and recreational facilities.

Advisory Committee on Gatineau Park
The League dissolved in 1947, when its more prominent members were appointed to the Federal District Commission's Advisory Committee on Gatineau Park.

Former League President Percy Sparks was unanimously elected chairman of the Advisory Committee at its first meeting in 1947. He continued to make significant contributions to park planning by writing the 1949 Report of the Advisory Committee on the Gatineau Park and the 1952 Report on the Master Plan for the Development of Gatineau Park. The latter document highlighted significant divisions among committee members over the issue of private property in the park.

Sparks resigns from Gatineau Park committee
In 1954, Sparks resigned from the Advisory Committee over a disagreement with Federal District Commission Chairman General Howard Kennedy. In his last public statement on the park, a 1956 Memorandum to a joint parliamentary committee, Sparks charged that certain landowners were undermining park development for selfish reasons, underlining that General Howard Kennedy owned land in Gatineau Park. Sparks also mentioned that Lac Philippe residents had received expropriation notices, while their Meech Lake and Kingsmere counterparts had not, although the Meech and Kingsmere Lakes were far more important to park development.

League and Sparks officially recognized
The National Capital Commission recognized Sparks' key contribution as president of the Federal Woodlands Preservation League and Chairman of the Advisory Committee on Gatineau Park, during an official ceremony dedicating the Roderick Percy Sparks Exhibition Hall in the park's visitor centre on July 8, 2005.

See also
 Gatineau Park
 Percy Sparks

References

Environmental organizations based in Ontario
Organizations based in Ottawa